Yaroslav Senyshyn, also known as Slava, is a Canadian pianist, author, and professor of philosophy, music aesthetics, and moral education at Simon Fraser University's Faculty of Education.

Education
Senyshyn was one of two pupils of Antonina Yaroshevich, from the Kiev Conservatory, and of Canadian pianist and composer, Larysa Kuzmenko. He has also studied with Damjana Bratuz, Howard Munn, Clifford von Kuster, Katherine Wolpe and Pierre Souverain.

Contributions

Senyshyn is the former President of the SFUFA (Simon Fraser University Faculty Association) and sat for three years as an Executive member-at-large on the CAUT (Canadian Association of University Teachers) Executive for three years (2006–2009). Within these roles he explored the ethical dimensions under the auspices of moral and aesthetic concerns into national and international problems of governmental authoritarianism in higher education.

Senyshyn is a Professor of Music and Philosophy of Aesthetics and Moral Education at Simon Fraser University's Faculty of Education. He has published extensively in journals such as Philosophy of Music Education Review, the Journal of Educational Thought, Educational Leadership, and the Canadian Journal of Education. In the field of music education, Senyshyn has contributed to teacher education and the professional development of music educators nationally and internationally through his lecture-recitals and publications that focus on the teacher-as-artist and the unique contribution that music makes to arts education.

Senyshyn is noted for his prodigious technique and beauty of sound. He has a huge dynamic range coupled with highly variegated nuances of pianistic tone colour, especially evident, in the pianissimo range. But his highly developed intellect never loses sight of the music's form and innate structure. His repertoire is vast. He is especially known for his Liszt performances that are highly charged and infused with subtle pianistic colors and a blazing virtuosity. He performs and records the standard repertoire along with contemporary works by Larysa Kuzmenko, Donald Cochrane, Reeves Miller, and others.

Research
Senyshyn's research interests have been consistently related to interdisciplinary research in arts and moral education. His method of philosophical analysis draws mainly, but not exclusively, on an existential-phenomenological approach. More recently, his work included a discursive analysis of students' discourse related to performance anxiety that combined a theoretical exploration of social constructionism based on Wittgenstein's philosophy. Within these broad parameters he has focused on various specific topics related to creative performance, teaching and music aesthetics vis-à-vis co-authorship of musical texts, subjectivity, objectivity, and anxiety in the moral-aesthetic fabric of society. Musical concerns have acted as analogies for interdisciplinary and curricular-theoretical educational issues.

Senyshyn is also one of the co-investigators on the Research For Youth, Music and Education and MODAL Research Project, which focuses on researching youth participation and engagement in musical activities, as well as artistic learning research.

Discography

Yaroslav Senyshyn: Rachmaninoff Preludes and Etudes - Tableaux (2012) 
Yaroslav Senyshyn Live: Bach-Siloti Beethoven Liszt Miller Cochrane (2010) 
Yaroslav Senyshyn Live Volume II: Schubert Schumann Tchaikovsky Liszt (2010)
Yaroslav Senyshyn Live Volume III: The Kennedy Center: Beethoven Chopin Brahms Revutsky Schubert Smith (2010)
Yaroslav Senyshyn & Suzie O'Neill-Senyshyn: Live at Von Kuster Hall (Piano and Flute) (2009)

Performances
Senyshyn's appearances have won him acclaim in many major concert halls throughout the world including New York's Carnegie Hall, Washington's John F. Kennedy Centre, Toronto's St. Lawrence Centre and Massey Hall, and the Bolshoi Hall at the Moscow Conservatory. Georgetown University Radio featured Senyshyn in a program about Canadian pianists, including Glenn Gould, Louis Lortie, Angela Hewitt, and Anton Kuerti. Senyshyn is an official Steinway Artist, as well as signed on with Albany Records.

Senyshyn was one of two pianists chosen to represent Canada at the International Tschaikovsky Competition, 1974 in Moscow. More recently he has been a guest performer at various venues and institutions, including the University of Western Ontario. He regularly performs benefit concerts to raise awareness of social justice issues, including annual benefit concerts in Ottawa with his wife Susan O’Neill-Senyshyn in support of Discovery University's courses for the homeless. The benefit concerts contribute to Discovery University and its program of university courses for low-income and homeless people in Ottawa, Ontario.

Senyshyn is also a well-established musical collaborator. He has collaborated with sitar player Sanjoy Bandopadhyay.

Senyshyn will be releasing two of William David Smith's compositions, Images ("Image" 1 and 2, Op. 33) on the Albany Records label in the near future in a 'live' album along with his wife, Susan O'Neill-Senyshyn (flautist). Together they will feature the works of Franck and Ibert for piano and flute. Senyshyn will also perform, live on this album,  solo works of Liszt and Canadian composers: Larysa Kuzmenko, Reeves Miller and William D. Smith.

Selected publications

Essay reviews

Refereed papers
 
 
 
 
 
 
Senyshyn, Y. "Understanding and Working with Performance Anxiety in Education" (under review).
Senyshyn, Y. " 'Once Upon a time in the West': Opera and Soundscape" (in preparation).
Senyshyn, Y. "Respecting Students, Acquiring Humility and Ignoring the Curriculum" (under review).
Senyshyn, Y. (2004/2005) "The Hegelian Exhaustiblity of Art and Danto's End of Philosophy: Existential Thought and Polymetric Music in Di Cicco's Poetry" (Italian Canadiana (University of Toronto), 18, 37–48.
Senyshyn, Y. (2005) "Rise of Authoritarianism in Higher Education: A Critical Analysis of the Research Assessment Exercise in British Universities". Journal of Educational Thought, 39(3), 229 – 244).
Senyshyn, Y. (2005) "Old Texts and Opera—Inciting Students to Read". Educational Leadership - "The Adolescent Learner", 62(7), 74–77.

 
 
 
 
 
 
Senyshyn, Y. (1998) "Opera and Co-authorship: Implications for Ethics and Aesthetics". Musica-Realta, 55.

Book chapters
Senyshyn, Y. (1998) "Subjectivity Revisited: Passion as Truth in Music Education". In Eunshik Choi and Myng-sook Auh (Eds.), "Searching for a New Paradigm of Music Education Research". Editors: The Korean Music Education Society, Hawoo Publishers.
Senyshyn, Y. (2004) "Popular Music and the Intolerant Classroom" in Questioning the Music Education Paradigm Published by the Canadian Music Educators' Association as Volume 2 of The Biennial Series, Research to Practice, Lee R. Bartel, Series Editor. Toronto: Canadian Music Educators' Association. pp. 110–120.
Senyshyn, Y. (2007) "Philosophy and Music in the Art of a Poet" in The Last Effort of Dreams by Francesco Loriggio, Waterloo: Wilfrid Laurier Press. . .
 
O'Neill, S. and Senyshyn, Y. "Philosophical and Psychological Learning Theories: How They Shape Our Understanding of Musical Learning" (book chapter to appear in: Colwell, R. and Webster, P. (forthcoming). MENC Handbook of Research on Music Learning. New York: Oxford University Press).

Books
Senyshyn, Y. (2010) The Artist in Crisis: Kierkegaard's Philosophy of the Aesthetic Stage of Existence and Live Musical Performance. Vancouver, BC: Platon Promotions Publishing.  and 9780557560936
Senyshyn, Y. (in preparation) Upside Down and Inside Out: a Fresh Look at Teachers and Teaching in Education
Senyshyn, Y. (in preparation) A Tractatus of Music
Senyshyn, Y. (in preparation) Essential Issues in Music Performance

Published conference papers (refereed)
O'Neill, S., Senyshyn Y. (2012) "On Meaning Making and Measurement of Student Music Engagement by ISME Research Commission 2012, July 8–13 Thessaloniki, Greece, The International Society for the Study of Music Education: Bulletin of the Council for Research in Music Education (in press).
Senyshyn, Y. (2005) "Anxiety and Memory in Live Musical Performance" published in the Proceedings of the APSCOM 2 (The Second International Conference of Asia Pacific Society for The Cognitive Science of Music) held in Seoul, Korea from August 4 – 6, 2005, pages 190–194, .
Senyshyn, Y. (2002)  "The Philosophy and Psychology of Performance Anxiety and its Subjective, Relational, and Discursive Potentiality" Proceedings of the 7th International Conference on Music Perception and Cognition, Sydney, 2002, 117–120. C. Stevens, D. Burnham, G. McPherson, E. Schubert, J. Renwick (Eds.). Adelaide: Causal Productions. 
Senyshyn, Y. (1999) "Wittgenstein, Music and Colour: Implications of Scientism and Inwardness". Toward Scientific Literacy: The History and Philosophy of Science and Science Teaching" Proceedings of the Fourth International Conference, Canada, June 21–24, 1997. Edited by Linda Lentz and Ian Winchester. Faculty of Education, University of Calgary Publications, 671-681 (CD of Conference Proceedings: 1999).

References

1950 births
Living people
Musicians from Toronto
Academic staff of Simon Fraser University
University of Toronto alumni
University of Western Ontario alumni
21st-century Canadian pianists